The Laughing Saskia (Hungarian: A Nevetö Szaszkia) is a 1916 Hungarian silent drama film directed by Alexander Korda and starring Sari Körmendy, Dezső Kertész and László Békeffi.

Cast
 Sari Körmendy 
 Dezső Kertész 
 László Békeffi
 Gyula Fehér

Bibliography
 Kulik, Karol. Alexander Korda: The Man Who Could Work Miracles. Virgin Books, 1990.

External links

1916 films
Hungarian silent films
Hungarian drama films
1910s Hungarian-language films
Films directed by Alexander Korda
Hungarian black-and-white films
Austro-Hungarian films
1916 drama films
Silent drama films